Macquarie Trio is an Australian chamber music ensemble. They received nominations for the 1996 and 2001 ARIA Awards for Best Classical Album with their album Beethoven Piano Trios and Schubert: Complete Piano Trios. The Trio has commissioned works by Nigel Westlake and  Elena Kats-Chernin. The Trio disbanded in 2006 after the Macquarie University withdrew their funding.

Discography

Albums

Awards and nominations

ARIA Music Awards
The ARIA Music Awards is an annual awards ceremony that recognises excellence, innovation, and achievement across all genres of Australian music. They commenced in 1987. 

! 
|-
| 1996
| Beethoven Piano Trios
|rowspan="2" |  Best Classical Album
| 
|rowspan="2" |  
|-
| 2001
| Schubert: Complete Piano Trios
| 
|-

References

Australian classical music groups